Isabel May (born November 21, 2000) is an American actress. She starred as Katie Cooper on the Netflix series Alexa & Katie and had a recurring role as Veronica Duncan on the CBS series Young Sheldon. She held the lead role of Zoe Hull in the film Run Hide Fight . She is the narrator and protagonist of the Paramount+ series 1883 and she is also the narrator for 1923.
After auditioning for three years without landing a role, May and her parents decided to have her schooling done online starting in tenth grade so that she could concentrate on acting. Six months later, she landed the role of Katie in Alexa & Katie with no acting experience and limited training. She later joined the cast of Young Sheldon as the love interest of Sheldon's brother Georgie. She stars as the party host in the independent film Let's Scare Julie, a 90-minute continuously shot film produced in 2018, about scaring the reclusive girl next door at a Halloween party. Run Hide Fight had its world premiere at the Venice Film Festival on September 10, 2020.

In 2021, May starred as Elsa Dutton, the lead character and the show’s narrator in the Paramount+ western limited series, 1883, a prequel of Yellowstone. She received positive reviews from critics and was named as one of the most promising young stars in Hollywood by The Hollywood Reporter. She later returned to role as the narrator for 1923. In 2022, May also appeared in an supporting role in the romantic comedy film I Want You Back. She was also cast alongside KJ Apa in the DC Extended Universe's Wonder Twins, but it was later canceled due to budget cuts at Warner Bros. Discovery. She later was cast as a female lead opposite Casey Affleck in independent thriller film The Smack.

Filmography

Film

Television

References

External links
 

21st-century American actresses
American child actresses
American film actresses
American television actresses
Actresses from Santa Monica, California
Living people
2000 births